Henk Bos may refer to:

 Henk Bos (painter) (1901–1979), Dutch painter
 Henk J. M. Bos (born 1940), Dutch historian of mathematics
 Henk Bos (footballer) (born 1992), Dutch footballer
 Henk Bos (speedway rider), see 2010 Individual Speedway European Championship